Duzakh (in Persian دوزخ) is hell in the Persian mythology.

This word was dao‘aη úha- in Avestan and dušox in Middle Persian.

Hell, in Zorostrianism is described as a deep well, terrifying because it is dark, stinking, and extremely narrow. The smallest of the xrafstars (harmful creatures) are as big as mountains, and all devour and destroy the soul of the damned.

There happens the most horrible punishments and tortures adapted to the sins committed by the damned. There is much emphasis on sexual crimes, but also on other actions disapproved of by Mazdean ethics. 

All atmospheric calamities are associated with it: snow, cold, hail, rain, burning heat, and so forth.

Duzakh is used as a word for hell in many languages including Kurdish, Turkmen, Uzbek and Urdu.

Sources
Encyclopædia Iranica: Iranian Religions: Zoroastrianism: Hell & its Concept in the Iranian Culture, By: Philippe Gignoux.
Zâdspram, Wizîdagîhâ, ed. and tr. with comm. Philippe Gignoux and Ahmad Tafazzoli as Anthologie de Zâdspram, Paris, 1994.

Persian mythology
Conceptions of hell
Locations in Persian mythology